Ilmari Reinikka (10 August 1906 – 31 July 1978) was a Finnish athlete. He competed in the men's high jump at the 1932 Summer Olympics.

References

External links
 

1906 births
1978 deaths
Athletes (track and field) at the 1932 Summer Olympics
Finnish male high jumpers
Olympic athletes of Finland
People from Kurikka
Sportspeople from South Ostrobothnia